Seun Olulayo (born 29 March 1996) is a professional Nigeria  footballer who is currently with Nigerian Premier League club Sunshine Stars F.C.

Career
Seun Olulayo began his career with Rising Stars F.C. In 2012, he  was transferred to Sunshine Stars F.C., where he played in the Nigerian Professional Football League. Olulayo signed with Abia Warriors in November 2016.

He won the 2016 CAF U-23 Championship with the Nigeria Dream Team.

International career
Seun Olulayo was member of the Nigeria U-20 2014. He started his professional football career with Rising Stars F.C. in the year 2010 and got promotion into the senior team Sunshine Stars F.C. in 2012.

References

External links
Seun Olulayo Goals assisted - Youtube
Seun Olulayo Personal Actions- Youtube
Seun Olulayo Nigeria U-20 Call up - National Team call-up

1996 births
Living people
Nigerian footballers
Sunshine Stars F.C. players
Rising Stars F.C. players
Karamone F.C. players
Nigeria international footballers
Nigeria Professional Football League players
Association football wingers
Association football fullbacks
Abia Warriors F.C. players
Footballers from Enugu